Fredrik Horn (8 June 1916 – 18 November 1997) was a Norwegian association football player who competed in the 1936 Summer Olympics. He was a member of the Norwegian team, which won the bronze medal in the football tournament.

References

External links

profile

1916 births
1997 deaths
Norwegian footballers
Footballers at the 1936 Summer Olympics
Olympic footballers of Norway
Olympic bronze medalists for Norway
Norway international footballers
Olympic medalists in football
Medalists at the 1936 Summer Olympics
Association football defenders
Lyn Fotball players